The All-Ireland Senior Hurling Championship 1918 was the 32nd series of the All-Ireland Senior Hurling Championship, Ireland's premier hurling knock-out competition.  Limerick won the championship, beating Wexford 9-5 to 1-3 in the final.

Format

All-Ireland Championship

Final: (1 match) The winners of the Leinster and Munster championships contested this game.  The winner was declared All-Ireland champions.

Results

Leinster Senior Hurling Championship

Munster Senior Hurling Championship

All-Ireland Senior Hurling Championship

Championship statistics

Miscellaneous

 Due to Spanish flu most games were delayed.

References

Sources

 Corry, Eoghan, The GAA Book of Lists (Hodder Headline Ireland, 2005).
 Donegan, Des, The Complete Handbook of Gaelic Games (DBA Publications Limited, 2005).

1918
All-Ireland Senior Hurling Championship